Buttaigudem or Buttayagudem is a village in the Eluru district of the Indian state of Andhra Pradesh. The nearest railway station is Kaikaram(KKRM) located at a distance of 40.26 Km.

Demographics 

 Census of India, Buttayagudem had a population of 12,394 (5,944 males and 6,450 females with a sex ratio of 1085 females per 1000 males; 1,120 children are in the age group of 0–6 years, with a sex ratio of 986). The average literacy rate stands at 68.64%.

References 

Villages in West Godavari district